Nos: Book of the Resurrection (translated, from the Spanish Nos: Libro de la Resurrección, in collaboration with the author by Gela Jacobson) is a book by Chilean diplomat Miguel Serrano.  The author states in the introduction: "it is neither a poem, nor a novel, nor a philosophical essay, although it contains a little of each of these."  

In it Lucifer is defined as he "whom others have called" Apollo, Abraxas, Siva, and Quetzalcoatl, also Odin-Wotan (and to the Cathars, Luci-Bel).  "He came down from the Morning Star, Venus."  As leader of the losing side of a stellar battle, he descended to the North Pole where he founded Ultima Thule, the capital of Hyperborea.  The Grail is identified as having been a jewel which fell from his crown (broken by the sword of the enemy during his battle in the heavens).  "He is the God of the Defeated Ones in the Kaliyuga" and "the supreme Guide of the Pilgrims of the Dawn" who will be the victor "when the Golden Age returns."

The book was published in English by Routledge & Kegan Paul in 1984 (pbk).  It contains illustrations drawn by Wolfgang vom Schemm.  In it are reproduced lines and poems by Irene Klatt, Omar Cáceres, William Blake, Hölderlin, Rilke, Shelley, D. H. Lawrence, Rabindranath Tagore, Leopardi, Virgil, and Ezra Pound's translation of poems of the troubadour Bertran de Born.

Contents
 Introduction
 Dedication
 Eternal Return
 A Turn of the Wheel
 Another Turn of the Wheel
 The Return of Allouine
 The Metamorphosis of the Elephant
 Death in Anahata
 The Master speaks about what follows
 The Solitude of the Trialogue
 The End of Kaliyuga. The Return of the Golden Age
 Dictionary of Initiation of A-Mor

External links
 Excerpt from Nos: The Book of Resurrection

1984 books
Occult books
Philosophy books
Chilean literature